Box Cricket League - Punjab (BCL Punjab) is an Indian televised sports reality entertainment show contested annually by teams representing various cities of Punjab, India. It is an indoor, unisex league, where the team players are celebrities from the film, music and television industries.

Concept 
The concept of BCL - Punjab concept is similar to the concept of box cricket which is a 10 over format cricket match played with a soft ball.

Telecast 
The first season of BCL Punjab will be telecast from 28 May 2016 on PTC Punjabi, PTC Chakde, and 9X Tashan channel. The television programme will show each of the matches in an episodic manner. Besides the matches, the episodes will show the players' preparations, the discussions in the players' dressing rooms, as well as it will mix a lot of fun and entertainment in the form of games, contests and dance performances. In this league the girls are not mere cheer leaders but would also be a part of the team playing along with the male players.

Owner 
The league is owned by Mr. Sumit Dutt (Director of Leostride Entertainment Pvt. Ltd. and Xamm Telemedia Works Pvt. Ltd.). He bought the franchise of the league from Marinating Films in 2015.

BCL Punjab Teams 
Box Cricket League - Punjab (BCL-Punjab) is a 10 overs cricket tournament reality show where different franchise teams consisting of Punjabi Actors and Singers compete for the Box Cricket League-Punjab title. The tournament started in 2016 and will take place every year. It is currently produced by "Sumit Dutt" There are five teams in Box Cricket League Punjab. As it turned out, the teams taking part in the Box Cricket League are participants in a reality show, organized by producers from Mumbai and brought to reality a hybrid of sports and real life by all the favorite stars of film and pop. 

Ambersariye Hawks based in Amritsar; Team Captain - Suyyash Rai
Jalandhariye Panthers based in Jalandhar; Team Captain - Navraj Hans
Ludhianvi Tigers based in Ludhiana; Team Captain Vikramjeet Virk
Chandigarhiye Yankies based in Chandigarh; Team Captain Kunal Pant
Royal Patialvi based in Patiala; Team Captain Gavie Chahal

Ambarsariye Hawks, the team of Amritsar, emerged as the champions of BCL Punjab-Season 1.

References 

Cricket on television
Indian sports television series
Indian reality television series
2016 Indian television series debuts
Indoor cricket